"Turn Me Away (Get MuNNY)" is a song by R&B singer Erykah Badu, also the second single from her album New Amerykah Part Two (Return of the Ankh).  It was produced by Badu and Karriem Riggins, and is a semi-remake of the song "You Can't Turn Me Away", by Sylvia Striplin.  The song also contains lyrics from "Get Money", as performed by Junior Mafia and The Notorious B.I.G.

Chart history

References

External links 
 

2010 singles
Erykah Badu songs
Songs written by Erykah Badu
Universal Motown Records singles
2010 songs